Zé Ramalho Canta Bob Dylan – Tá Tudo Mudando is the second tribute album by Brazilian singer-songwriter Zé Ramalho, released in 2008. This time, he pays an homage to Bob Dylan, whose "Knockin' on Heaven's Door" had already been covered by him. Most of the songs' lyrics were almost literally rewritten to Portuguese. The album cover is a reference to Dylan's known promotional film clip for the 1965 song "Subterranean Homesick Blues". "O Vento Vai Responder", a cover of "Blowin' in the Wind", was used in the soundtrack of the Rede Globo telenovela, Caminho das Índias.

The album was nominated for the 2009 Latin Grammy Award for Best Brazilian Rock Album., but lost it to Agora by NX Zero and Sacos Plásticos by Titãs, who shared the prize.

Before recording the final versions, all covers were taken by Sony Music Brazil president, Aloysio Reis, to the United States, so that Dylan and his staff could listen to it. Dylan reportedly approved all versions "with praise" All songs are sung in Portuguese, except "If Not for You". Ramalho says he thought that "covering a song like this one, singing in the natural language and arranging it the way I did, with a galloping northeastern rhythm, it would be interesting, and I think it was! This arrangement is also inspired by the recording of this song that George Harrison did in his album All Things Must Pass."

Track listing 

Literal translations of Portuguese song titles in parenthesis.

Personnel 
 Zé Ramalho  – Acoustic guitar, arrangements, lead vocals
 João Ramalho – Acoustic guitar
 Roberto Frejat – Electric guitar on "Rock Feelingood", sitar, bass guitar and twelve-string viola on "O homem deu nome a todos animais"
 Phil Braga – Lead acoustic guitar, slide guitar and twelve-string viola
 Chico Guedes – Bass guitar
 Dodô Moraes – Keyboards and accordion
 Zé Gomes – Percussion
 Eduardo Gema – Cajón
 Eduardo Constant – Snare drum and cymbals
 Robertinho de Recife – Arrangements
 Roberta de Recife, Robenita Moraes and Alessandro Rocha – Choir

See also
List of songs written by Bob Dylan
List of artists who have covered Bob Dylan songs

References 

2008 albums
Zé Ramalho albums
Bob Dylan tribute albums